Maprik/Wora Rural LLG is a local-level government (LLG) of East Sepik Province, Papua New Guinea.

Wards
01. Klabu 1
02. Klabu 2
03. Jame
04. Niamikum
05. Kuminimbis 1
06. Kuminimbis 2
07. Nagipaim
08. Neligum
10. Maprik 1
11. Kinbangua
12. Wora
13. Gwelikum 1
14. Gatnikum
15. Aupik
16. Lehinga
17. Ningalimbi
18. Serakikum
82. Maprik Urban

References

Local-level governments of East Sepik Province